The Women's Area Championship was a women's cricket competition organised by the Women's Cricket Association that ran from 1980 until 1996. It operated as a 55-over limited overs cricket competition, with teams organised into a number of groups, often with a final. It was replaced in 1997 by the Women's County Championship.

The teams competing in the Championship were a variety of county teams, county Second XIs, regional teams and Invitational XIs. The tournament was the first formalised women's cricket competition in England, with teams having previously only played one-off and friendly matches. Between 1988 and 1994, the competition was followed by the Women's Territorial Tournament, competed for by regional sides selected from the Area Championship teams.

Yorkshire were the most successful side in the history of the Area Championship, winning six titles, including all of the last five tournaments. East Midlands and Middlesex won three titles apiece.

History
The inaugural Women's Area Championship took place in 1980, with 12 teams taking part in four regional groups. Middlesex beat West Midlands in the final to become the first Champions. The initial twelve teams became regular competitors over the course of the tournament, briefly joined by the WCA Invitational XI in 1986 and 1989, by A Woods' XI and BA Daniels' XI in 1990 and Surrey Second XI in the final two seasons. Since 1988, the tournament was dominated by two teams: Yorkshire and East Midlands. They played each other in three finals, and overall Yorkshire achieved six titles and three runners-up places in this period, and East Midlands gained three titles and four runners-up places.

Structure
The Women's Area Championship went through a variety of formats throughout its existence. Initially, teams played in four regional groups, with the winners progressing to the semi-finals. Later on, teams played in two pools, with the winners proceeding to the final. In the final two seasons of the Championship, teams were organised into two divisions with promotion and relegation, with the winner of Division One being crowned the Champions: this format was carried forward into the Women's County Championship. The teams that played in the tournament were:

Winners

See also 
 Women's County Championship
 Women's Territorial Tournament

References

English domestic cricket competitions
Women's cricket competitions in England
Recurring sporting events established in 1980
1980 establishments in England
Recurring sporting events disestablished in 1996
1996 disestablishments in England